The Jazz Mandolin Project was an acoustic jazz fusion group formed in Burlington, Vermont, by Jamie Masefield in 1993.

Masefield played banjo with dixieland bands, including the Preservation Hall Jazz Band, before switching to mandolin. In 1996, the debut album consisted of Gabe Jarrett on drums and Stacey Starkweather on bass. The following year the group broke up, and Masefield kept the name with different musicians: bassist Chris Dahlgren and drummer Jon Fishman from Phish. They recorded the next album, Tour de Flux. Masefield described the band's music as " very contrapuntal stuff, like a three-way conversation."

The Project's next album, Xenoblast was on Blue Note Records, though it was less a jazz album and more improvisational jazz rock, featuring the guitarist Trey Anastasio of Phish. 

In 2003 they released a drum & bass-influenced album called Jungle Tango, which included Ari Hoenig and Danton Boller. In 2005 Masefield returned to a more acoustic sound with The Deep Forbidden Lake, which features cover versions of songs by Radiohead, Tom Waits, Leonard Cohen, and Django Reinhardt.

Discography
 The Jazz Mandolin Project (Accurate, 1996), (Lenapee, 2004)
 Tour de Flux  Records (Accurate, 1999)
 Xenoblast (Blue Note, 2000), (EMI Digital, 2003)
 After Dinner Jams  (Lenapee, 2001), (DKE, 2004)
 Jungle Tango  (Lenapee, 2003)
 The Deep Forbidden Lake (Lenapee, 2005)

Personnel
 Jamie Masefield — Acoustic and electric mandolin, charango, and tenor banjo (All)
 Stacey Starkweather — Electric and acoustic bass, effects, and mellotron (1996)
 Chris Dahlgren — Double bass, imbera, and music box (1999, 2000)
 Danton Boller — Acoustic and electric bass (2001, 2003)
 Greg Cohen — Upright bass (2005)
 Gabriel Jarrett — Drums and percussives (1996)
 Jon Fishman — Drums and cuica (1999),  Piano (2001)
 Ari Hoenig — Drums, piano (2000, 2001, 2003)
 Gil Goldstein — Piano, accordion (2001, 2003, 2005)
 Chris Lovejoy — Percussion (2001, 2003)

References

American jazz ensembles
Culture of Burlington, Vermont
Musical groups from Vermont
Musical groups established in 1993
1993 establishments in the United States